This is a list of public art in Horsham.

References

Outdoor sculptures in England
Horsham